Toot Toot! is the ninth album by Australian band the Wiggles, released in 1998 by ABC Music distributed by EMI. It won the ARIA Award for Best Children's Album in 1998.

Track listing

Domestic edition
source:

North American edition

Musicians
source:
Vocals: Greg Page
Backing Vocals: Mark Punch, Paul Paddick, Kevin Bennett, Jeff Fatt, Anthony Field, Murray Cook
Guitars: Murray Cook, Anthony Field, Tony Douglass
Bass: Murray Cook
Drums/Percussion: Tony Henry, Paul Hester
Violin: Maria Schattovits
Cello: Margaret Lindsay
Trumpet: Dominic Lindsay

Release history
The album was released in 1998 in CD and cassette formats:
 ABC Music: 7243 4 94411 25.
 ABC Music: 7243 4 94411 49.
 ABC Music: 7243 4 96238 2 8 – CD re-release with new artwork
 Koch Records: KOC-CD-8685 – CD 2003 release with newer artwork

Gallery

Video

Toot Toot! is the seventh video by the children's band the Wiggles. It was released in Australia on 17 October 1998, and later re-released in 1999 to reflect set updates during production of the TV series. In the United Kingdom, the video was released under the title Big Red Car.

Song list
Look Both Ways
John Bradlelum
Henry's Underwater Big Band (1999 version only)
Head, Shoulders, Knees and Toes
Food, Food, Food (Oh How I Love My Food)
Go Captain Feathersword, Ahoy!
Bathtime (1998 version only)
Do the Wiggle Groove
Dorothy the Dinosaur (Tell Me Who Is That Knocking?)
Balla Balla Bambina
I Climb Ten Stairs
 Move Your Arms Like Henry
Silver Bells That Ring in the Night
Wags the Dog, He Likes to Tango
We're Dancing with Wags the Dog
Officer Beaples' Dance
Zardo Zap
Let's Have a Ceili
Toot Toot, Chugga Chugga, Big Red Car

Cast
The Wiggles:
Anthony Field
Jeff Fatt
Murray Cook
Greg Page

Additional cast:
Paul Paddick as Captain Feathersword
Leeanne Ashley as Dorothy The Dinosaur
Edward Rooke as Wags The Dog
Elisha Burke as Henry the Octopus
Leanne Halloran as Officer Beaples
Leanne Halloran and Elyssa Dawson as Zardo Zap
Mitchell Butel as Raiffe the Mechanic

Release date 

Toot Toot! was first released on 17 October 1998.

In 1999, the Wiggles re-released the video, but made significant edits to reflect changes made in the television series.  Although the general story is still about The Wiggles having to find a way to fix their Big Red Car, the songs were re-recorded and the scenes were redone with new animations and backgrounds. "Bathtime" and its introduction were replaced with a new version of the "Henry's Underwater Big Band" video.

The video was dedicated to the memory of Anthony's father, John Patrick Field, who played John the cook on the original 1994 version of Yummy Yummy.

The 1999 version was released to DVD in 2004 in Australia. The extras include a Wiggly Work storybook and two episodes from the Lights, Camera, Action TV series.

From November 2019–January 2020, the video was uploaded to the Wiggles' YouTube channel in multiple parts.

References

External links
 

1998 video albums
ARIA Award-winning albums
1998 albums
The Wiggles albums
The Wiggles videos
1990s English-language films